Veerasamar is an Indian art director and actor who has appeared in Tamil language films. Veerasamar started his career as assistant to art director Sabu Cyril and made his breakthrough as an actor with a leading role in Veerasekaran (2010) and has often appeared in films in both lead and comedy roles.

Career
Veerasamar began his career as an art director by apprenticing art director Sabu Cyril in director S. Shankar Boys (2003), before moving on to work in highly successful films including Kaadhal (2004), Veyil (2006) and Poo (2008).

Veerasamar made his acting debut through Veerasekaran (2010), which had a low profile release. The film later garnered attention for being the first film of actress Amala Paul, who became popular after her performance in Prabhu Solomon's Mynaa (2010). However, he has reminded us of his art directorial skills through a couple of songs. Two other films K. T. Kunjumon's Kadhalukku Maranamillai and Samy's Sarithiram were completed but failed to be released. He later moved back to playing supporting roles and prioritising his career as an art director, notably working on Kaadhal, Veyil, Dishyum, Komban (2015), Marudhu (2016), Kadaikutty Singam (2018), Jackpot(2019), Namma Veetu Pillai (2019), Thanni Vandi (2021), Akka kuruvi  (2022),VJS46 (2022), Yaathum ooraey yaavarum kelir (Upcoming), Journey-Web Series (Upcoming)

Filmography 
Actor

Art director

Kaadhal (2004)
Anbe Vaa (2005)
Dishyum (2006)
Veyil (2006)
Vaazhthugal (2008)
Poo (2008)
Akku (2008)
Paandi (2008)
Sarithiram(Not released)
Veerasekaran (2010)
Pandi Oliperukki Nilayam        (2012)
Komban (2015)
Marudhu (2016)
Kadaikutty Singam (2018)
Saavi (2018)
Pattipulam (2019)
Jackpot (2019)
Namma Veetu Pillai (2019)
Thanne Vandi (2021)
Akka Kuruvi (2022)
Aattral (2022)
DSP (2022)
Tamilkkudimagan (Upcoming)
Yaadhum Oore Yaavarum Kelir (Upcoming)
Kaaduvetty (Upcoming)
Journey-Web series (Upcoming)

References 

 https://m.timesofindia.com/entertainment/tamil/movies/news/vivek-and-vijay-sethupathi-collaborate-for-the-first-time/articleshow/72111547.cms
https://m.timesofindia.com/entertainment/tamil/movies/news/thanne-vandi-is-not-about-tamil-nadus-water-crisis/articleshow/70104750.cms
https://m.timesofindia.com/entertainment/tamil/movies/news/karthis-next-film-titled-kadaikutty-singam/articleshow/62506516.cms

External links 

Indian male film actors
Male actors in Tamil cinema
Living people
21st-century Indian male actors
Indian art directors
Artists from Chennai
21st-century Indian designers
Indian production designers
Year of birth missing (living people)